Picasso's Rose Period represents an important epoch in the life and work of the Spanish artist Pablo Picasso which had a great impact on the developments of modern art. It began in 1904 at a time when Picasso settled in Montmartre at the Bateau-Lavoir among bohemian poets and writers. Following Picasso's Blue Period – which depicted themes of poverty, loneliness, and despair in somber, blue tones – Picasso's Rose Period represents more pleasant themes of clowns, harlequins and carnival performers, depicted in cheerful vivid hues of red, orange, pink and earth tones.

Based largely on intuition rather than direct observation, Picasso's Rose Period marks the beginning of the artist's stylistic experiments with primitivism; influenced by pre-Roman Iberian sculpture, Oceanic and African art. This led to Picasso's African Period in 1907, culminating in the Proto-Cubist Les Demoiselles d'Avignon, regarded as a masterpiece.

Overview
	
The Rose Period lasted from 1904 to 1906. Picasso was happy in his relationship with Fernande Olivier whom he had met in 1904 and this has been suggested as one of the possible reasons he changed his style of painting. Harlequins, circus performers and clowns appear frequently in the Rose Period and populated Picasso's paintings at various stages throughout the rest of his long career. The harlequin, a comedic character usually depicted in checkered patterned clothing, became a personal symbol for Picasso.

The Rose Period has been considered French influenced, while the Blue Period more Spanish influenced, although both styles emerged while Picasso was living in Paris. Picasso's Blue Period began in late 1901, following the death of his friend Carlos Casagemas and the onset of a bout of major depression. It lasted until 1904, when Picasso's psychological condition improved. The Rose Period is named after Picasso's heavy use of pink tones in his works from this period, from the French word for pink, which is rose.

Picasso's third highest selling painting, Young Girl with a Flower Basket, and his fifth highest, Garçon à la pipe (Boy with a pipe) were both painted during the Rose Period. Other significant Rose Period works include: Woman in a Chemise (Madeleine) (1904–05), The Actor (1904–1905), Lady with a Fan (1905), Two Youths (1905), Harlequin Family (1905), Harlequin's Family With an Ape (1905), La famille de saltimbanques (1905), Boy with a Dog (1905), Nude Boy (1906), Boy Leading a Horse (1905–06), and The Girl with a Goat (1906).

See also
Picasso's Blue Period
Picasso's African Period
List of Picasso artworks 1901–1910

References

Suggested reading
Wattenmaker, Richard J.; Distel, Anne, et al. (1993). Great French Paintings from the Barnes Foundation. New York: Alfred A. Knopf.   
    

Paintings by Pablo Picasso
Paintings in the collection of the Museum of Modern Art (New York City)
Works about children
Nude art
Children in art
Paintings of children